Donald Poe Galloway (July 27, 1937 – January 8, 2009) was an American stage, film and television actor, best known for his role as Detective Sergeant Ed Brown in the long-running crime drama series Ironside (1967–1975). He reprised the role for a made-for-TV film in 1993. He was also a politically active Libertarian and columnist.

Early life
Galloway was a 1955 graduate of Bracken County High School, where he played varsity basketball, and a 1959 graduate of the University of Kentucky, where he studied drama.

Career

Early acting roles
On April 16, 1962, Galloway appeared in an off-Broadway production of the play Bring Me a Warm Body.  Despite the production running for only 16 performances, he received a Theater World Award.

Galloway began his television career in 1962 in the New York-based soap opera The Secret Storm as the first actor to play Kip Rysdale. He then appeared as law clerk Mitchell Harris in 26 episodes of the short-lived TV legal drama Arrest and Trial (1963–64), and also was seen on Tom, Dick, and Mary, one-third of the 90-minute weekly sitcom 90 Bristol Court, broadcast from 1964 to 1965.

In 1963, Galloway signed up with Universal Studios and guest-starred on numerous TV series including The Virginian, Wagon Train, Convoy and Run for Your Life.

Ironside (1967–1975)
On March 28, 1967, Galloway starred alongside Raymond Burr in the TV movie Ironside. The film detailed the shooting of San Francisco Chief of Detectives Robert Ironside (played by Burr), who was left paralyzed and confined to a wheelchair. The film spawned a successful series of the same name, beginning in September of that year. As Det. Sgt Ed Brown, Galloway remained on Ironside with Burr and Don Mitchell for its eight-season run, appearing in 198 of the 199 episodes.

Later career
Following the cancellation of Ironside in 1975, Galloway was reunited with his former co-star from the show, Barbara Anderson, in the TV movie You Lie So Deep, My Love. He then continued to guest-star on numerous TV series, with appearances in Police Woman, Medical Center and Charlie's Angels among others.

In 1979, Galloway played Timmons in the short-lived NBC comedy Hizzonner. The same year, he hosted a syndicated game show called The Guinness Game, which was produced by Bob Eubanks. Galloway also made a few appearances on the popular game show Match Game.

In one of his few big-screen appearances, in 1983 Galloway played the husband of the character played by Jobeth Williams in the film The Big Chill. He joined the cast of the ABC soap opera General Hospital in 1985, playing Buzz Stryker until 1987.

In 1988, Galloway appeared in the Perry Mason TV movie The Case of the Avenging Ace, reuniting with former co-star Raymond Burr for the first time in 13 years. Galloway and Burr had a long association with one another; aside from Ironside and a subsequent Perry Mason movie in 1990, the two actors also starred together in the 1973 TV movie Portrait: A Man Whose Name Was John. In 1993, Galloway and Burr would appear together on screen for the final time, reprising their Ironside roles alongside fellow co-stars Don Mitchell, Barbara Anderson and Elizabeth Baur in the TV reunion movie, The Return of Ironside.

Personal life
After retiring from acting, Galloway briefly worked for the San Bernardino County (California) Sheriff's Department as a deputy sheriff.

For a time after his acting career, Galloway resided in Hooksett, New Hampshire and wrote a column for the Manchester Union Leader newspaper, espousing his Libertarian political views.

Death
Galloway died at age 71 at the Renown Regional Medical Center in Reno, Nevada after suffering a stroke two weeks earlier.

Filmography

Film

Television

References

External links
 
 
 Don Galloway at Amgad TV

1937 births
2009 deaths
Male actors from Kentucky
American columnists
American libertarians
American male film actors
American male soap opera actors
American male television actors
People from Brooksville, Kentucky
People from Hooksett, New Hampshire
20th-century American male actors
University of Kentucky alumni